Acrapex relicta is a moth of the family Noctuidae. It is found in South Carolina, North Carolina and south-eastern Virginia.

The length of the forewings is 7.5–10 mm for males and 8.5–10 mm for females.

External links
First Record Of The Genus Acrapex From The New World, With Description of a new Species from the Carolinas and Virginia (Noctuidae, Amphipyrinae)
Image

Xyleninae
Moths of North America